The 26th Venice Biennale, held in 1952, was an exhibition of international contemporary art, with 26 participating nations. The Venice Biennale takes place biennially in Venice, Italy. Winners of the Gran Premi (Grand Prize) included French painter Raoul Dufy, American sculptor Alexander Calder, German etcher Emil Nolde, and Italians painter Bruno Cassinari ex aequo with Bruno Saetti, sculptor Marino Marini, and etcher Toni Zancanaro.

References

Bibliography

Further reading 

 
 
 
 
 
 
 
 
 
 
 
 

1952 in art
1952 in Italy
Venice Biennale exhibitions